Sultan Bathery is a town and municipality in Wayanad district of Kerala, India, near the borders with Tamil Nadu and Karnataka states. The largest town in Wayanad district, it is the headquarters of Sultan Bathery taluk.

The place came to be known by the name Sultan Bathery after the Mysore ruler Tipu Sultan invaded the region and used the Jain Temple located here as a battery.

Location
Sulthan Bathery lies on the Kozhikode–Kollegal  National Highway (NH 766) 97 km from Kozhikode. It is 114 kilometers from Mysore and about 100 kilometers from Ooty (Udagamandalam). It is also connected with Nilambur.
The people primarily depend on agriculture for a living.
Sulthan Bathery is situated at about 930 metres above mean sea level. The town has the National Highway 766 passing through it. The town is the centre of tourism in Wayanad District.

Etymology
This town was part of Kidanganadu village, which got its name because of the presence of the Kidangans the tribes. The town was known by the name Ganapathivattam in the later years, named after the Ganapathi Temple. During the invasion of Malabar by Mysore ruler Tipu Sultan, the town was used by the Mysore army as the storeroom or battery for his ammunition. Thus the town came to be known as Sultan's Battery and later as Sultan Bathery, the Malayalam version of its name.

History

Sultan Bathery is a historical place and its ancient history goes in sync with the history of Wayanad. The recorded history of this district exists only from the 10th century onward. In 930 AD, emperor Erayappa of Ganga Dynasty led his troops to the south-west of Mysore and after conquering, called it Bayalnad meaning the land of swamps. After Erayappa, his sons Rachamalla and Battunga fought each other for the new kingdom of their father's legacy. Rachamalla was killed and Battunga became the undisputed ruler of Bayalnad. In 12th century AD, Gangas were dethroned from Bayalnad by Kadamba dynasty of North Canara. In 1104 AD Vishnuvardhana of Hoysala invaded Bayalnad followed by Vijayanagara dynasty in 16th century. In 1610 AD Udaiyar Raja Wadiyar of Mysore drove out Vijayanagara General and became the ruler of Bayalnad and the Nilgiris. Bayalnad is the present Wayanad. When Wayanad was under Hyder Ali's rule, the ghat road from Vythiri to Thamarassery invented. Then the British rulers developed this route to Carter road. 

The British rule in Wayanad has two periods. The first was the rule of the East India Company, which ruled Wayanad from the hands of Pazhassi Raja. It continued until the queen took direct control from the East India Company in 1858. Until 1947, Wayanad was under the rule of the Malabar Collector. History has it that Wayanad has a rich folk culture that gave way to the British domination of Wayanad. Edakkal Caves are also evidence of the existence of the Neolithic civilization in Wayanad.  According to HS Graeme, Thalassery Sub-Collector TH Balan was the first to start a revenue settlement in Wayanad. In Grammy's time there were divisions of Munnadu, Muthoornadu, Ilangkornadu, Nallurnadu, Edanashankur, Poronnur, Kurumbala, Wayanad, Nambikkoli and Ganapathivattam.  They were divided into new parts for administrative convenience. The importance and relevance of the place Ganapativattom has been mentioned often in the reports. History records that Sultan Bathery later became the place of Ganapathivattam on the roadside during the battle of Hyder Ali and Tipu.  It is believed that the centuries-old Ganpati temple was converted into a Ganapativattom.  The British named the Sultan's Battery, which in later history means the Sultan's Armory, as Ganapathivattam was known as a small synonym for Ganapathivattam. It is believed to have been a commercial center during this period and a place on the road to Mysore. Ganapati grew as the medieval cities flourished, the four-way street, the main highway, and the center of worship. In 1934, the Kidanganad Panchayat was established.  From the administration of the Malabar District Board, Ganapathivattam became the administration of Kidanganad panchayat. The Niluppuzha Panchayat was formed in 1968 by the division of Kidanganad Panchayat, Nenmeni Panchayat in 1974 and Sultanbathery Panchayat in 1968. New places of worship and educational institutions have emerged in different parts of the panchayat with the support of Hindu, Muslim and Christian communities. The Ganapati Temple, the Jain Temple and the Malankara Mosque are examples of the ancient history of Sultan Bathery. There is evidence that Sultanbathery and other parts of Wayanad had been in contact through Tamil, Karnataka and Kodagu villages since medieval times. Sultan Bathery is known as the confluence of ancient and ancient cultures. The history of Sultan Bathery completes the history of the colonists and bureaucrats who came to the land for the reward of their plight. In the late 20th century, the first glimpses of educational activities began to appear. As a result of the efforts of the 1920s, an LP school was established in the Sultan Bathery under the Malabar District Board.  From then until now the progress of the country has been enormous. From time immemorial, the region was home to the native tribes of Chettiars, Paniyar, Kurumar and Urali Nayakkar.  Although there are many ethnic groups among the tribals, their main occupation is agriculture. The panchayath has 26 temples, 15 churches and 15 mosques. Sultan Bathery has a Jain temple that is about 2000 years old. The center, which is in the possession of the Department of Archeology, has no festivals other than temple rituals.  The festival at Sultan Bathery Mariamman Kovil is one of the festivals celebrated here.  It is considered as the national festival of Bathery. Similar festivals are celebrated in the Bathery Mahaganapathi Temple, Kuppadi Devi Temple and Karivallikkunnu Temple.

Education

There are many government and private school offering education.
Compared to other districts of Kerala, institutions offering higher education are limited in Wayanad. One of the oldest colleges in Wayanad is St Mary's College, Sulthan Bathery, established in 1965. This arts and science college is affiliated to University of Calicut. Pazhassi Raja College, Pulpally, established in 1982, is another major college located nearby.  Government Engineering College located at Mananthavady is the nearest engineering college. It is affiliated to Kannur University.

Transportation

Sultan Bathery has very good road connectivity with south Indian states. The major Road is NH 766 connected to Mysore, Bangalore and Kozhikode, two State highways connected to Ooty and Coimbatore and a state highway connected to Mangalore, Kannur, Thalassery and Kasaragod. Sulthan Bathery is the biggest transport hub of Wayanad district.  It is located near the border with the Karnataka state.  There is a  major Kerala Transport Depot in Sulthan Bathery. Most of the long-distance buses to Kozhikode, Ooty and Bangalore start from this depot. The town also has two smaller bus stations for local travellers. The Periya ghat road connects Mananthavady to Kannur and Thalassery. The Thamarassery mountain road connects Calicut with Kalpetta. The Kuttiady mountain road connects Vatakara with Kalpetta and Mananthavady. The Palchuram mountain road connects Kannur and Iritty with Mananthavady. The road from Nilambur to Ooty is also connected to Wayanad through the village of Meppadi.

The nearest railway stations are at Mysore and Calicut.  The nearest airports are at Mysore, Calicut and Kannur.

Geography

Politics
Sulthan Bathery assembly constituency is part of Wayanad (Lok Sabha constituency). Its MP is Rahul Gandhi (INC), and the MLA is I. C. Balakrishnan (INC).

The Sulthan Bathery Municipality is governed by LDF since 2015. 
 Chairperson: T.K Ramesh (CPI(M))
 Vice Chairperson: Elsy Paulose (CPI(M))

Since its establishment in 1962, the Bathery panchayat has been a monopoly of the Indian National Congress-led UDF. P. C.  Ahmed Haji (Indian Union Muslim League) was the first president. He was president for 3 decades. The LDF was in power for only eight months in 2005 with the help of the DIC(K). The President was Mr. CK Sahadevan who later became the first chairman when it was converted to municipality in 2015.

Municipality Chairperson

Members of Legislative Assembly

Municipality ViceChairperson

Grama Panchayat President

Municipality

Places of worship
 Sultan Bathery Jain Temple - A Jain temple believed to have been built in the 13th century. It is one of the main Jain shrines in Kerala.
 SulthanBathery Jumaa masjid: This is the biggest jumaa masjid in the town and it can hold more than 1000 worshippers. The masjid is situated near the Sulthan Bathery town bus stand.
 Ganapati Temple: Sulthan Bathery Ganapathi Temple is a famous Lord Ganesh Temple. It built eight centuries ago. Sulthan Bathery was formerly known as Ganapathivattom, signifying the presence of this ancient Lord Ganapathy Temple.
 Masjid Madeena: A jump masjid in town run by Jama at e Islami Hind (JIH)
 Soonoro Church: St. Mary's Jacobite Syrian Orthodox Church, Sulthan's Bathery is a famous pilgrim centre in Wayanad. 
 Masjidul Mnar : A Juma Masjid run by Kerala Nadvathul Mujahideen.
 Shaduli Masjid: The famous juma masjid in the town.
 St. Mary's Orthodox Cathedral, Sulthan Bathery: This is one of the main churches for people who follow the Malankara Orthodox Syrian Church.
 Assumption Church: Is one of the major Christian churches located in the heart of the city.
 Mariyamman Temple: This is the most important temple for the local tribes. The yearly festival is in February–March which gathers a lot of crowds.
 CSI St. Thomas Church: This church is situated near police station.
 The Pentecostal Mission (TPM): The Faith Home (church) is situated at College Road, Kottakunnu.
 India Pentecostal Church of God, Thrikkepatta, Sulthan Bathery
 Masjid Jami'a Ideal Campus, Snehagiri, Sulthan Bathery
 Thalachill Temple, Sulthan Bathery
 Narasimha temple, Sulthan Bathery
 Church of God in Malabar, located near the Stadium, Manikuni
 Assemblies of God in India Church, Chungam
 St. Thomas Malankara Syrian Catholic Cathedral,  Sulthan Bathery
 Church of God (Full Gospel) in India city Church.

Tourism

 Edakkal Caves
 Jain Temple
 Krishnagiri Stadium
 Thovarimala Ezhuthupara
 Wayanad Heritage Museum, Ambalavayal
 Wayanad Wildlife Sanctuary

Climate
Sulthan Bathery has a salubrious climate. The mean average rainfall in this area is 2322 mm. Lakkidi, Vythiri and Meppadi are the high rainfall areas in Wayanad. The annual rainfall in these areas ranges from 3000 to 4000 mm. High-velocity winds are common during the southwest monsoon and dry winds blow in March–April. High altitude regions experience severe cold. In Wayanad (Ambalavayal) the mean maximum and minimum temperature for the last five years were 29 °C and 18 °C respectively.  This place experiences high relative humidity, which goes even up to 95 per cent during the southwest monsoon period. Generally the year is classified into four seasons, namely, cold weather (December–February), hot weather (March–May), south-west monsoon (June–September)and northeast monsoon (October–November) seasons.

Notable residents 
 Basil Joseph, director in Malayalam film industry.

See also
Jainism in Kerala
Mysorean invasion of Malabar
Sultan Battery (Mangalore)

References

External links
 
 
 Official website of the Wayanad district

Cities and towns in Wayanad district
Sultan Bathery area
Tourist attractions in Wayanad district